The Pakistan Weightlifting Federation (PWLF) is the national governing body to develop and promote the sport of Weightlifting in the Pakistan. The foundation was formed in 1947 and is headquartered in Lahore.

Affiliations
The foundation is affiliated with:
 International Weightlifting Federation
 Asian Weightlifting Federation
 Pakistan Sports Board
 Pakistan Olympic Association

National Championship 
Weightlifting is regular part of biannual National Games. The federation organize annual National Weightlifting Championship.

Affiliated Bodies

Provincial 
 Punjab weightlifting association
 Sindh weightlifting association
 Khyber Pakhtunkhwa weightlifting association
 Balochistan weightlifting association
 Islamabad
 Azad Kashmir

Departmental 
 Pakistan Army
 Pakistan WAPDA
 Pakistan Railways
 Higher education Commission (HEC)

Other 
 National Women Weightlifting Commission
 Pakistan Weightlifting Coaches Commission
 Pakistan Weightlifitng Referee Commission

External links
 Official Website

References

Sports governing bodies in Pakistan
National members of the Asian Weightlifting Federation
1947 establishments in Pakistan
Sports organizations established in 1947